The Royal Aircraft Factory S.E.7 was a proposed single-engined, single seat biplane designed at the Royal Aircraft Factory in First World War.

The S.E.7 used the same design and layout as the S.E.6 but differed in using a radial engine, the 14-cylinder R.A.F. 8.

References

Sources

Bruce, J.M. British Aeroplanes 1914-18. London:Putnam, 1957.
Hare, Paul R. The Royal Aircraft Factory. London:Putnam, 1990. .
Lewis, Peter. The British Fighter since 1912. London:Putnam, Fourth edition, 1979. .
Mason, Francis K. The British Fighter since 1912. Annapolis, USA:Naval Institute Press, 1992. .

1910s British fighter aircraft
SE06